Robert Knights (22 July 1931 – 24 March 2011) was a British water polo player. He competed in the men's tournament at the 1956 Summer Olympics.

References

1931 births
2011 deaths
British male water polo players
Olympic water polo players of Great Britain
Water polo players at the 1956 Summer Olympics
People from Islington (district)